SLL (acronym for Studio LuluLala), formerly known as JTBC Studios, is a South Korean drama production, distribution and talent management company. It is a subsidiary of JTBC.

In 2022, JTBC Studios was rebranded as SLL as part of worldwide Korean content expansion. SLL is an acronym for "Studio LuluLala" with the meaning of "LuluLala" in Korean signifying "express joy and adventure", and the name was based on their currently existed multimedia production house prior to the company name change.

Production works

Television series

Film

Subsidiaries 
Television production
 Drama House Studios
 Production H
 Studio Phoenix
 Zium Content
 Npio Entertainment
 Anthology Studio 
 Betty and Creators
 How Pictures
 wiip studios (based in the United States)

Movie production
 B.A. Entertainment (Also involved in television production)
 Film Monster (Also involved in television production)
 Perfect Storm Film

Multimedia production
 Climax Studio (formerly Lezhin Studio)

References

External links
  

JTBC
1999 establishments in South Korea
Mass media companies established in 1999
Television production companies of South Korea
Companies based in Seoul